Crenosoma is a genus of nematodes belonging to the family Crenosomatidae.

The species of this genus are found in Europe and Northern America.

Species:
 Crenosoma brasiliense Vieira, Muniz-Pereira, Lima, Moraes Neto, Guimaraes & Luque, 2012 
 Crenosoma caucasicum Rodonaja, 1951

References

Nematodes